The 2010 Channel One Cup took place between 16 and 19 December 2010. Five matches were played in Megasport Arena in Moscow, Russia, and one match was played in Barona Areena in Espoo, Finland. The tournament was a part of the 2010–11 Euro Hockey Tour.

Russia won the tournament before the Czech Republic and Sweden, while Finland ended up fourth.

Standings

Results
All times local

Scoring leaders
GP = Games played; G = Goals; A = Assists; Pts = Points; +/− = Plus/minus; PIM = Penalties in minutes; POS = PositionSource: Swehockey

Goaltending leaders
TOI = Time On Ice (minutes:seconds); SA = Shots against; GA = Goals against; GAA = Goals against average; Sv% = Save percentage; SO = ShutoutsSource: Swehockey>

Tournament awards
Best players selected by the directorate:
Best Goaltender:  Vasiliy Koshechkin
Best Defenceman:  Miroslav Blaťák
Best Forward:  Alexander Radulov
Most Valuable Player:  Aleksei Morozov

See also
Channel One Cup (ice hockey)

References

2010-11 Euro Hockey Tour
2010–11 in Swedish ice hockey
2010–11 in Russian ice hockey
2010–11 in Finnish ice hockey
2010–11 in Czech ice hockey
2010
2010
December 2010 sports events in Europe
December 2010 sports events in Russia
2010 in Moscow
Sport in Espoo
International ice hockey competitions hosted by Russia